Louise Augusta of Denmark and Norway (7 July 1771 – 13 January 1843) was the daughter of the Queen of Denmark-Norway, Caroline Matilda of Great Britain. Though officially regarded as the daughter of King Christian VII, it is widely accepted that her biological father was Johann Friedrich Struensee, the king's royal physician and de facto regent of the country at the time of her birth. She was referred to sometimes as "la petite Struensee"; this did not, however, have any effect on her position.

Early life

She was born at Hirschholm Palace in present-day Hørsholm municipality, Denmark.  After the arrest of Struensee and Queen Caroline Matilda on 17 January 1772, and the subsequent execution of Struensee and the banishment and imprisonment of her mother, she was raised at the Danish court residing at Christiansborg Palace, Copenhagen along with her four-year-old brother, Crown Prince Frederick, under the supervision of Juliana Maria of Brunswick-Wolfenbüttel. Louise Augusta and her brother had a very close relationship their entire life, and it was on his request that she agreed to marry, despite the fact that she had no enthusiasm for the match. She was her brother's closest friend, and he developed a strong resentment toward Queen Juliana Maria when she tried to separate them.

Marriage

In February 1779 the nation's foremost statesman, Chief Minister Andreas Peter Bernstorff, hatched an ingenious plan for the young princess.  Since a son of hers could ascend the throne some day, it would be advantageous to arrange a marriage early, and to marry the "half-royal" back into the family, to the Hereditary Prince of Augustenborg.  This plan not only had the positive effect of more closely connecting the Danish royal house's two lines, the ruling House of Oldenborg and the offshoot House of Augustenborg, thus discouraging the threat of a breakup of the kingdom, but also the prevention of her marriage into the Swedish royal house.

Her future spouse was a prince with an exceptionally high concentration of recent Danish ancestors. He was closely related to all important families of the then high nobility of Denmark. The binding agreements were made a year later, and in spring 1785 the 20-year-old Duke Frederick Christian II came to Copenhagen. The engagement was announced then, and a year later, on 27 May 1786 the 14-year-old Louise Augusta was married at Christiansborg Palace.

Life at the Danish court 

The couple lived at the Danish court in Copenhagen for many years until the Christiansborg Palace fire of 1794 and the death of the elder Duke of Augustenborg (Frederik Christian I, 1721–1794), when her husband inherited the estate and the Duchy.  The princess was often the center of court activities, and was proclaimed the “Venus of Denmark”; she was the real female center of the Danish royal court even after her brother's marriage in 1790. After 1794 they lived during the summer on the island of Als and at Gråsten. They lived in Denmark in the winters and in Augustenburg during the summers, where she held a lively court, where artists, such as the poet Jens Baggesen, were among her admirers.

The spouses were dissimilar: while Louise Augusta was extroverted, lively, beautiful and pleasure-loving, her spouse was unattractive, serious, interested in philosophy and politics. She was said to have many lovers, among them most notably the doctor Carl Ferdinand Suadacini, who treated her for infertility and was believed to have fathered her children, though this cannot be proven.  Louise Augusta felt sympathy for the French revolution and had therefore anti-British views from 1789 onward.

Later life 

Over the years conflict developed between her husband and her brother, especially over the relationship of the double-duchies of Schleswig-Holstein and his small appanage around Sonderborg on one hand and the Danish monarchy on the other.  She remained loyal to the Danish Royal House or rather, to her brother, throughout the differences, and acted as his agent with her spouse.  In 1810 she worked actively to stop the Duke's attempts to be chosen as successor to the Swedish throne, which were linked with the duke's younger brother Charles August of Augustenburg becoming chosen by Swedes and then dying, after which Jean-Baptiste Bernadotte, Marshal of France and Prince of Ponte Corvo, was elected.

Their relationship eventually fell apart, and Frederik Christian tried to legally limit her influence over their children's future.  He died on 14 June 1814, and Louise Augusta took control of the Augustenborg estates and the children's upbringing.  The estate was turned over to the eldest son, Christian August, on his return from an extended foreign tour in 1820. From then on she resided in the Augustenborg Castle, where she established an eccentric court.  In 1832 in order to give her youngest son, Frederik Emil August, better income possibilities she purchased the estate Nør and Grønwald in Dänischwold near Ekernførde Fjord in South Schleswig. She had a close and warm relationship with her daughter and her son-in-law, but her relationship to her sons was tense.

She died at Augustenborg in 1843, when her brother's reign in Denmark had already ended and Christian VIII, her son-in-law, ascended - she thus died as the mother of the then Queen of Denmark.

Louise Augusta in culture and legacy 

Two portraits of her were painted by Danish artist Jens Juel.  The first from 1784 is in Royal Collection, London, and the second from 1787 is in the Frederiksborg Palace Museum.  Another portrait of her by Anton Graff is in Sønderborg Castle.

Danish author Maria Helleberg has written a best-selling historical novel based on the life of Louise Augusta called "Kærlighedsbarn" ("Love Child"), which inspired a special biographical exhibition on the life of the princess at Rosenborg Castle.

Fort Augustaborg in Ghana was named after her.

Issue
 Caroline Amalie (28 September 1796 – 9 March 1881), who would become Queen of Denmark as consort to Christian VIII
 Christian August (19 July 1798 – 11 March 1869),  the Duke of Holstein-Sonderburg-Augustenburg (who was to become a pivotal figure in the Question of Schleswig-Holstein in the 1850s and 1860s). In order to hold to potential Danish feelings, he was married to a Danish relative, Countess of Danneskjold-Samsoe.
 Frederik Emil August (23 August 1800 – 2 July 1865), the “Prince” of Nør (Noer)

Ancestry

References

Citations

Bibliography 

 
 Dansk Kvindebiografisk Leksikon (in Danish)

External links 

 Princess Louise Augusta at the website of the Royal Danish Collection at Rosenborg Castle

Danish princesses
Norwegian princesses
1771 births
1843 deaths
Princesses of Schleswig-Holstein-Sonderburg-Augustenburg
People from Hørsholm Municipality
People from Augustenborg, Denmark
Children of Christian VII of Denmark
Daughters of kings